Jonathan Bartlett Jennings (born March 27, 1974) is an American politician serving as a senator in the Maryland State Senate since 2011. A member of the Republican Party, he was first elected to the Maryland House of Delegates in 2002 to represent District 7, which covers both Baltimore County and Harford Counties. He served as minority leader of the Senate from 2014 to 2020.

Personal life and family

Jennings grew up in Phoenix, Maryland. As a child he was an active 4-Her, raising market lambs and cattle and showing them at various fairs including the Maryland State Fair. At the age of sixteen he joined the Jacksonville Volunteer Fire Company Station 47, where he was a firefighter and emergency medical technician. He eventually became a lieutenant before serving on the board of directors. In 1994, he and several other firefighters from Maryland were sent to Idaho to fight wildfires that were raging due to an extreme drought. They received recognition from Maryland governor William Donald Schaefer for their actions.

He is a graduate of Baltimore County Public Schools. Jennings attended Carrol Manor Elementary School, Cockeysville Middle School, and graduated from Dulaney High School. After graduation, he attended Essex Community College, where he graduated and received his A.A. in 1995. Jennings then transferred to the University of Baltimore, where he graduated in 1997 with his B.S. in Business Administration.

While in college, he worked at the United States Capitol for Congressman Robert Ehrlich as a staff assistant. In 1998, Jennings became the co-owner and president of a feed store in Hereford, Maryland, The Maryland Feed Company. In 2007, he merged The Maryland Feed Company with The Mill to create The Mill of Hereford.

Jennings has been farmer since his days in 4-H. While in college he worked on a dairy farm before starting his own beef cattle farm where he raises Black Angus.

He married Michelle Slusher in 2004.

Jennings is an instrument rated pilot. He has served in the Maryland Air National Guard with the 135th Airlift Squadron since 2008. He is a loadmaster, having initially trained on the C-130 before transitioning to the C-27J Spartan. In 2012, he transferred to the 276th Cyberspace Operations Squadron. He was activated and deployed during the 2015 Baltimore protests and riots.

House
Jennings was a member of the Maryland House of Delegates from 2003 to 2011. Since his election to the House of Delegates, Jennings has been very active in environmental and agricultural issues. He served on Environmental Matters Committee (2003–06), the Agriculture Preservation & Open Space subcommittee (2003–06), the Wetlands & Waterways Funding Work Group in 2004, and the Natural Resources subcommittee in 2006. Jennings was the chair of the Natural Resources work group in 2004, was a member of the Agricultural Stewardship Commission from 2005 to 2006, and has been a member of the Maryland Fire, Rescue and EMS Caucus since 2003. He has also been on the Maryland Rural Caucus and the Maryland Legislative Sportsmen's Caucus since 2003.

His efforts were recognized when he was selected as Deputy Minority Whip (2003–06).

Senate
Jennings was elected to the Maryland Senate in 2010, and served on the Education, Health and Environmental Affairs Committee (environment and health occupations subcommittees, 2011–15), Joint Advisory Committee on Legislative Data Systems (2011–14), and Joint Committee on Transparency and Open Government (2011–14). He was appointed as the Senate's Minority Leader in 2014 and won reelection that year. Since 2015, Jennings has served on the Finance Committee (property & casualty and transportation subcommittees), Legislative Policy Committee, the Joint Committee on Legislative Information Technology and Open Government, the Joint Committee on Spending Affordability, and the Public Safety and Policing Work Group. In 2016, he joined the Executive Nominations Committee. In 2020, Jennings stepped down from his post as Minority Leader and was succeeded by Bryan Simonaire.

Election results

2018 General Election for Maryland State Senator – District 7
Voters to choose one:
{| class="wikitable"
|-
!Name
!Votes
!Percent
!Outcome
|-
|-
|J. B. Jennings, Rep.
|40,070
|  66.9%
|   Won
|-
|-
|Donna Hines
|19,780
|  33.0%
|   Lost
|-
|Other Write-Ins
|69
|  0.1%
|   Lost
|}

2014 General Election for Maryland State Senator – District 7
Voters to choose one:
{| class="wikitable"
|-
!Name
!Votes
!Percent
!Outcome
|-
|-
|J. B. Jennings, Rep.
|36,913
|  74.6%
|   Won
|-
|-
|Kim Letke
|12,502
|  25.3%
|   Lost
|-
|Other Write-Ins
|46
|  0.1%
|   Lost
|}

2010 General Election for Maryland State Senator – District 7
Voters to choose one:
{| class="wikitable"
|-
!Name
!Votes
!Percent
!Outcome
|-
|-
|J. B. Jennings, Rep.
|28,890
|  65.9%
|   Won
|-
|-
|Rebecca Weir Nelson, Dem.
|14,848
|  33.9%
|   Lost
|-
|-
|Jim Stavropoulos, Jr. (Dem. write-in)
|53
|  0.1%
|   Lost
|-
|Other Write-Ins
|64
|  0.1%
|   Lost
|}

2006 election for Maryland House of Delegates – District 7
Voters to choose three:
{| class="wikitable"
|-
!Name
!Votes
!Percent
!Outcome
|-
|-
|Richard Impallaria, Rep.
|21,333
|  18.7%
|   Won
|-
|-
|J. B. Jennings, Rep.
|21,189
|  18.6%
|   Won
|-
|-
|Pat McDonough, Rep.
|23,184
|  20.3%
|   Won
|-
|-
|Linda W. Hart, Dem.
|17,122
|  15.0%
|   Lost
|-
|-
|Jack Sturgill, Dem.
|15,390
|  13.5%
|   Lost
|-
|Rebecca L. Nelson, Dem.
|13,481
|  11.8%
|   Lost
|-
|-
|Kim Fell, Green
|2,307
|  2.0%
|   Lost
|-
|Other Write-Ins
|83
|  0.1%
|   Lost
|}

2002 election for Maryland House of Delegates – District 7
Voters to choose three:
{| class="wikitable"
|-
!Name
!Votes
!Percent
!Outcome
|-
|-
|Richard Impallaria, Rep.
|18,749
|  17.0%
|   Won
|-
|-
|J. B. Jennings, Rep.
|22,470
|  20.4%
|   Won
|-
|-
|Pat McDonough, Rep.
|20,869
|  18.9%
|   Won
|-
|-
|Michael F. Linder, Libertarian
|2,817
|  2.6%
|   Lost
|-
|-
|Jack Sturgill, Dem.
|15,390
|  15.0%
|   Lost
|-
|Other Write-Ins
|80
|  0.1%
|   Lost
|}

References

External links
 Official biography

|-

1974 births
21st-century American politicians
Living people
Republican Party Maryland state senators
Republican Party members of the Maryland House of Delegates
People from Baltimore County, Maryland
University of Baltimore alumni